CINA (1650 kHz) is a commercial AM radio station, licensed to Mississauga, Ontario, Canada and serving the Greater Toronto area. It is owned by Neeti Prakash Ray and it broadcasts a South Asian format of talk, news and music shows. It is co-owned with a similar station in Windsor, CINA-FM.

By day, CINA is powered at 5,000 watts. But to protect other stations from interference, at night it reduces power to 680 watts. During critical hours, the power is 1,000 watts. A non-directional antenna is used. The transmitter is on Eglinton Avenue East at Tomken Road in Mississauga.

Overview 
The station application was approved by the Canadian Radio-television and Telecommunications Commission (CRTC) on April 23, 2007. It began testing in late 2008. The official sign-on was in December 2008.

CINA focuses most of its airtime on Indian and Pakistani audiences, airing a mixture of community-oriented talk programming with Bollywood and other South Asian music. Owner Neeti Prakash Ray was formerly the host of Radio India, a popular local radio show which aired on CKTB in the 1990s. CINA's format is based in large part on that program.

On March 14, 2011, CINA received CRTC approval to increase the daytime transmitter power to 5,000 watts from the previous power of 1,000 watts. The nighttime power remains at 680 watts and all other technical parameters are unchanged.

Programming
CINA AM caters predominantly to the South Asian community, featuring programming in the following languages: Hindi, Bengali, Gujarati, Punjabi and Urdu. It also airs some Armenian and Indo-Caribbean programming on weekends.

References

External links
CINA 1650
 

Asian-Canadian culture in Ontario
Mass media in Mississauga
INA
INA
South Asian Canadian culture
Radio stations established in 2007
2007 establishments in Ontario